Judge Anderson is a fictional character from Judge Dredd comic books. Judge Anderson may also refer to:

Albert B. Anderson (1857–1938), judge of the United States Court of Appeals for the Seventh Circuit
Aldon J. Anderson (1917–1996), judge of the United States District Court for the District of Utah
G. Ross Anderson (1929–2020), judge of the United States District Court for the District of South Carolina
George W. Anderson (judge) (1861–1938), judge of the United States Court of Appeals for the First Circuit
Harry B. Anderson (1879–1935), judge of the United States District Court for the Western District of Tennessee
J. Blaine Anderson (1922–1988), judge of the United States Court of Appeals for the Ninth Circuit
Joseph F. Anderson (born 1949), judge of the United States District Court for the District of South Carolina
Percy Anderson (judge) (born 1948), judge of the United States District Court for the Central District of California
R. Lanier Anderson III (born 1936), judge of the United States Court of Appeals for the Eleventh Circuit
Robert P. Anderson (1906–1978), judge of the United States Court of Appeals for the Second Circuit
S. Thomas Anderson (born 1953), judge of the United States District Court for the Western District of Tennessee
Stephen H. Anderson (born 1932), judge of the United States Court of Appeals for the Tenth Circuit

See also
Wayne Andersen (born 1945), judge of the United States District Court for the Northern District of Illinois
Justice Anderson (disambiguation)